The Leave Us Alone Coalition is an idea popularized by conservative/libertarian activist Grover Norquist for a wide-ranging and loose collaboration among various elements of U.S. politics, united by a common desire for minimal involvement with and restrictions from government, especially the U.S. federal government.  There is no actual organization by this name.  Rather, it is a description of a hoped-for reality of cooperation between social conservatives, right-libertarians / free market supporters, and various single-issue voters, such as gun rights supporters.

The idea emphasizes what all these disparate forces tend to agree on: that they do not welcome federal laws coercing them in ways they dislike, such as federal efforts to impose liberal values, ban guns, and restrain or restrict free markets.  

It de-emphasizes what they tend to disagree on, for example, the desire of social conservatives to enact laws such as school prayer and other state endorsement of Christianity, blue laws, bans or restrictions on divorce, contraception, abortion, pornography, adultery, fornication, gay marriage, and sodomy; and occasional local laws passed by gun-rights supporters mandating gun ownership, all of which are examples of coercion that libertarians and free-marketeers would tend to oppose.

The term is sometimes also used, in rhetoric and polemics, in contrast to a so-called "Takings Coalition", whose constituent elements -- such as welfare recipients, government employees, unions, and companies or non-profits benefiting from government contracts, protectionism or other state action -- all depend on government spending, mandates, or preferences for their livelihood, rather than free markets or voluntarism.

Conservatism in the United States
Libertarianism in the United States